NH Investment & Securities Co., Ltd. (NH I&S) is one of the largest securities firms in Korea, offering a broad range of financial services, encompassing wealth management, investment banking, brokerage and merchant banking through 121 domestic branches and overseas subsidiaries.

History
NH Investment & Securities was established in 1969 under the name Hanbo Securities. Formerly known as LG Investment and Securities Co., Ltd., in December 2014, the company was transferred to Woori Finance Holdings Co., Ltd. and merged with Woori Securities on April 1, 2005, changing its name to Woori Investment & Securities Co., Ltd. In June 2014, it was transferred to NongHyup Financial Group, and on December 31, 2014, it merged with NH NongHyup Securities and changed its name once again to NH Investment & Securities.

See also
National Agricultural Cooperative Federation 
NH Bank

References

External links
 

Investment management companies of South Korea
Companies listed on the Korea Exchange
Financial services companies established in 1969
South Korean companies established in 1969